Gabrielle Hamilton (born 1966) is an American chef and author. She is the chef and owner of Prune, a restaurant in New York City, and the author of Blood, Bones, and Butter, a memoir.

Early life and education 
Hamilton, born in 1966, was raised in New Hope, PA. In an interview with NPR, Hamilton said her way of eating and cooking was heavily influenced by her French mother. She said her mother didn't waste food and the family often foraged for fresh ingredients from their garden and from the forests and fields surrounding their house. Hamilton attended undergraduate at Hampshire College in Amherst, MA and received her MFA in creative writing from the University of Michigan.

Hamilton’s sister, Melissa Hamilton  (cookbook author), is also a food writer and chef.  Their father owns Hamilton’s Grill Room in Erwinna, Pennsylvania.

Career 
Following a career in catering, Hamilton opened the restaurant Prune in the East Village in 1999. She had no formal experience in restaurants, nor did she attend culinary school. Her 30-seat restaurant garnered widespread acclaim and admiration from diners, critics and other chefs including Anthony Bourdain and Eric Ripert. Prune earned a spot in the Bib Gourmand section of the Michelin's 2014 New York guide. Hamilton was featured in the fourth season of the PBS show The Mind of a Chef. She also appeared as a guest judge on the first season of The Taste on ABC.

During the COVID-19 pandemic, Hamilton published a piece in The New York Times discussing the closure of Prune and broader implications of the pandemic for the restaurant industry in the United States.

Personal life 
Hamilton was married for 10 years to Michele Fuortes, an Italian-born teacher and researcher at Weill Cornell Medical College. They had two children, Marco and Leone, and later divorced. Hamilton is currently married to Ashley Merriman, who was her co-chef at Prune.

Bibliography

Books 
 
 Michiko Kakutani, in New York Times review in February 2011 called it "brilliantly written."
 Anthony Bourdain described it as "simply the best memoir by a chef ever."

Essays, reporting and other contributions 
 
Hamilton, Gabrielle (April 23, 2020). “My Restaurant Was My Life for 20 Years. Does the World Need It Anymore?” The New York Times.

Awards and honors 
Hamilton received the James Beard award for best chef in New York City in 2011 and again in 2012 for her chef memoir, as well as winning Outstanding Chef in 2018. She also earned a James Beard award for journalism in 2015 for a piece she penned for the travel magazine Afar; entitled "Into the Vines," the article documents the wines and winemakers of Sicily, Italy.

References

External links 
 
 "Cooking With Words" by Frank Bruni, The New York Times
 A Mentor Named Misty
 Excerpt from Blood, Bones & Butter
 

Living people
Hampshire College alumni
LGBT people from New York (state)
LGBT people from Pennsylvania
The New Yorker people
University of Michigan alumni
American women chefs
American women memoirists
American memoirists
James Beard Foundation Award winners
1966 births
21st-century American women
LGBT chefs
Chefs from Pennsylvania